The discography of Josh Tillman, an American singer-songwriter, consists of fourteen studio albums, six EPs, seventeen singles, a soundtrack and several contributions.

Albums

as J. Tillman 
 Business of the Heart (Unreleased demos recorded at Bluebrick Recordings)
 Untitled No. 1 (Broken Factory, 2003)
 I Will Return (self-released, 2004)
 Long May You Run, J. Tillman (Keep Recordings, 2006)
 Minor Works (Fargo, 2006)
 Cancer and Delirium (Yer Bird, 2007)
 Vacilando Territory Blues (Western Vinyl, 2009) – UK #191
 Year in the Kingdom (Western Vinyl, 2009)
 Singing Ax  (Western Vinyl, 2010)

as Father John Misty

with Fleet Foxes 
 Helplessness Blues (Sub Pop, May 3, 2011)

with Saxon Shore 
 Be a Bright Blue (Broken Factory Records, 2002)
 Four Months of Darkness (Burnt Toast Vinyl, 2003)

Notes

Live albums
 Off-Key in Hamburg (2020)

Extended plays

as J. Tillman 
 Documented (self-released, 2006)
 Isle Land (DVD/EP) (Bella Union, 2008)
 Laminar Excursion Monthly #8 (Procession at Night) (Crossroads of America Records/Flannelgraph Records, 2010)

as Father John Misty 
 The Demos (Sub Pop, 2012)
 "I Luv You HB" Demos (Sub Pop/Bella Union, 2015)
 Anthem +3 (Sub Pop/Bella Union, 2020)
 Live at Electric Lady (Sub Pop, 2022)

Soundtracks 
 The History of Caves (Sub Pop, 2013) (Soundtrack, as Josh Tillman)

Singles

Miscellaneous 
Contributions
 Demon Hunter – Demon Hunter (additional drums), Tooth & Nail Records, 2002
 Kid Cudi – "Young Lady" (feat. Father John Misty) – (Indicud, Republic Records, April 2013)
 Emile Haynie – "Ballerina's Reprise" (feat. Father John Misty and Julia Holter) – (We Fall, Interscope Records, February 2014)
 Botany – "Laughtrack" (feat. Father John Misty) – (not on album, Western Vinyl, October 2014). Free, digital download only.
 Beyoncé – "Hold Up" (writing credits) (April 2016)
 The Avalanches – "Saturday Night Inside Out" (feat. Father John Misty and David Berman) – (Wildflower, Modular, July 2016)
 Florence + the Machine – "Wish That You Were Here" (drums, additional vocals) – (Island, August 2016)
 Brad Neely's Harg Nallin' Sclopio Peepio – "This is America with Father John Misty" (September 2016)
 Lady Gaga – "Sinner's Prayer", "Come to Mama" (writing credits) – (Joanne, Interscope Records, October 2016)

Covers
 "Tillman Sings 'Tonight's the Night'" (self released, exclusively for Aquarium Drunkard, September 13, 2010) (as J. Tillman). Free, digital download only. Cover album of Neil Young's album Tonight's the Night (Reprise Records, 1975)

Notes

References 

Discographies of American artists
Folk music discographies
Discography